A cocoyea, also called coki-yea, is the wood-like shaft of a coconut tree leaf. Originally from Trinidad and Tobago, Cocoyea are used in kites and other handcrafts, as well as Carnival costumes
. However, the most common use for cocoyea is in a cocoyea broom, where several cocoyea are tied together in a bunch and used for sweeping.

References

Trinidad and Tobago culture